Delsy Ninan is an Indian playback singer from Kerala. She is also a VJ and has presented shows in Malayalam channels.

Early life 
Delsy did her schooling in Pathanamthitta. She completed her graduation in BA English BCM College , Kottayam; where her musical side was recognized and encouraged by her friends. Later on it was music director Sunny Viswanath who recognized her talent and introduced her into playback singing.

Career 
She started her career through the live show "Naalumani Pookkal" which was aired on Jeevan TV. Her first appearance in a band was through "GirlzBand" in Asianet. She was also part of "Star Band" which was the official band of the show Star Wars in Kairali TV. Her biggest break as a VJ came to her in 2014, when she anchored the super hit show "Surya Singer" in Surya TV  which brought her huge recognition among the public as well as professional circles alike. She has performed in the super hit TV show Music Mojo in Kappa TV. She has also rendered many Jingles and has been featured in various brand adverts. She has also recorded as well as performed in various stage shows with prominent artists in India as well as USA, Canada, UK, Australia, UAE, South Africa, Indonesia, Bahrain, Doha and Kuwait to name a few.

Career in Playback 
Delsy's playback singing career started off with the movie "Isra" in 2005, songs of which were composed by Sunny Viswanath. She rendered two songs in the movie. The following year music director Jassie Gift utilized her voice in two of his songs, of which the song "Neelathadagangalo" (Balram vs Tharadas) went on to become a very noted song. She also rendered two songs for the veteran music director Raghu Kumar for the movie Subhadram, of which the song "Swapnangale" was a duet with the legendary singer P. Jayachandran. In 2008, she ventured into Telugu playback through the movie 'John Appa Rao 40 Plus'. The song 'Meghalalo' from the movie made it to the hit charts that particular year.

She got her big break in playback singing through the 2010 Dileep starrer Malayalam movie 'Karyasthan' in which the song "Malayalai Penne" went on to become a super hit. This also kick started her association with the music direction duo Berny-Ignatious. In 2013, she sang two songs for Berny-Ignatious of which the song "Minnaminungin vettam", from yet again a Dileep starrer movie 'Sringaravelan'; went on to become a super hit. These two hits contributed in a big way into establishing Delsy as a sought after singer among the public as well as professional musicians. In 2015 she sang her first playback in Tamil, through the movie 'Romba Nallavanda Nee'. The song "Rajini Enakku" from the movie was well appreciated. She also sang the song "Poonchola" composed by Unni Nambiar in the movie "Village guys" the same year. In 2016, through the movie Sambar she was able to sing yet another duet "Poomkathirukal" with the legend P. Jayachandran. The songs in the movie were composed by Music director Sunny Viswanath. She also rendered the theme song of the movie "The Sambar Song". The movie also set another milestone in her life, as she made her debut as a lyricist by penning two songs in the movie.

Discography

Other Music

As lyricist

References 

Living people
Indian women playback singers
People from Pathanamthitta
Malayalam playback singers
Tamil playback singers
Telugu playback singers
Film musicians from Kerala
Year of birth missing (living people)
Singers from Kerala
Women musicians from Kerala
21st-century Indian singers
21st-century Indian women singers

External links
 

https://www.imdb.com/name/nm12705468/?ref_=nmexst_exst_nm